The Theodor Billroth Operating painting by Adalbert Seligmann (1890?) shows the German surgeon Theodor Billroth operating in the auditorium of Vienna General Hospital (Allgemeine Krankenhaus), significantly displaying all the participants wearing "white coats". The painting is exhibited in the Österreichische Galerie Belvedere in Vienna, Austria.

Footnotes

External links
 Theodor Billroth Operating (Billroth im Hörsaal) 
 Online gallery page

Austrian paintings
1890 paintings
History of surgery
Paintings in the collection of the Belvedere, Vienna